Fragile Equality is the second studio album by Brazilian power metal band Almah released in October 2008.

Track listing

Personnel 

 Edu Falaschi - vocals
 Felipe Andreoli - bass
 Marcelo Barbosa - guitar
 Paulo Schroeber - guitar
 Marcelo Moreira - drums

Charts

References

External links
 Almah at Myspace
 Official Site

2008 albums
Almah (band) albums